Dalasýsla was one of the pre-1988 traditional Counties of Iceland, located in the Western Region of the country. Its only town is Búðardalur.

The county had a rich history dating back to the first settlers of Iceland. Leif Erikson grew up in Dalasýsla in the 10th century, and Árni Magnússon, scholar and collector of manuscripts, was born at Kvennabrekka in Dalasýsla in 1663.

Painter Helgi Fríðjónsson was born in Búðardalur on March 7, 1953.

External links 

Counties of Iceland
Western Region (Iceland)